Minuscule 255 (in the Gregory-Aland numbering), α174 (Soden), is a Greek minuscule manuscript of the New Testament, on parchment. Paleographically it has been assigned to the 13th century. Formerly it was labeled by 252a and 302p. Scrivener labelled it by 249a.

Description 

The codex contains the text of the Acts of the Apostles, Catholic epistles, and Pauline epistles on 222 parchment leaves. The text is written in 2 columns per page, 26 lines per page. It has the same contents as minuscule 303.

Kurt Aland the Greek text of the codex did not place in any Category.

 1 Corinthians 2:14 it reads πνευματος (omit του θεου) along with 2, 216, 330, 440, 451, 823, 1827, and syrp.

History 

The manuscript was examined and collated by Matthaei. Formerly it was labeled by 252a and 302p. Gregory saw it in 1887. In 1908 Gregory gave the number 255 to it.

Formerly it was held in Berlin (Königliche Bibliothek, Ms. Gr. Quarto 40).

At the end of 1943 year has increased the frequency of the bombing of Berlin. The Prussian State Library sent many collections out of Berlin to be sheltered in Silesia for safekeeping. As the result of postwar border changes some of these collections were found in Poland (among them minuscule 255). They were moved to the Jagiellonian University Library.

The manuscript is currently housed at the Biblioteka Jagiellońska (Fonds der Berliner Hss. Graec. quarto 40) at Cracow.

See also 

 List of New Testament minuscules
 Biblical manuscript
 Textual criticism
 Minuscule 257

References

Further reading 

 C. F. Matthaei, Novum Testamentum Graece et Latine (Riga, 1782–1788).(as 12)
 Wattenbach, Schrift. z. Gesch. der gr. Schr. (Berlin 1876), Tabl. 13.

External links 

Greek New Testament minuscules
14th-century biblical manuscripts